ATN PM One is a Canadian exempt Category B Punjabi language specialty channel owned by Asian Television Network (ATN). It broadcasts Punjabi music and family based entertainment programming.

ATN PM One originally launched as ATN MH 1 on September 29, 2009 and is available on Bell Fibe TV, Cogeco, Rogers Cable, Shaw Cable & Optik TV.

In October 2017, ATN MH1 was renamed 'ATN PM One' due to loss of programming from MH1.

External links
 

Digital cable television networks in Canada
Music video networks in Canada
Television channels and stations established in 2009
Punjabi-language television in Canada